Jagz Kooner (born Jagjit Singh Kooner, 1967) is an English record producer who has worked with Radio 4, Manic Street Preachers, Garbage, Infadels and Primal Scream for whom he co-produced their cover version of the song "Some Velvet Morning" along with model Kate Moss.

He has created remixes for Massive Attack "Butterfly Caught" with additional vocals from the English electronic music vocalist Tara McDonald. His remix "My Beautiful Friend" from The Charlatans was so groundbreaking that it inspired Eddy Temple-Morris, a DJ at the XFM radio station to form a show dedicated to remixes. Kooner also worked with Rammstein, Siobhan Fahey, Ladytron, Adam Freeland, dEUS, Kasabian and more recently Reverend and the Makers.  His remix of "Swastika Eyes", for Primal Scream appears as one of two remixes of the track on the Xtrmntr album. He has remixed two songs from the Oasis album, Dig Out Your Soul. On the bonus CD available only as part of the Deluxe Edition, Jagz Kooner has remixed first single "The Shock Of The Lightning", as well as, the album track "The Turning". He has also been keenly involved in the UK mash-up scene. Jagz Kooner has also remixed "Mind Killer" by Adam Freeland.

Other bands
He was also a member of the bands The Aloof and Sabres of Paradise with Andrew Weatherall and Reverend and the Makers new project Reverend Soundsystem or otherwise known as RSS.

References

External links
 Discogs: Jagz Kooner
 MySpace: Jagz Kooner
 DV247 interview 

Living people
British record producers
1967 births